Rangomaramidae is a family of flies in the infraorder Bibionomorpha. The family, members of which are known as long-winged fungus gnats, was erected in 2002 by Jaschhof and Didham to include five new species of flies in the genus Rangomarama from New Zealand. The family was then expanded to include several other genera from across the world but preliminary studies show that the broad family, comprising several genera, is non-monophyletic.

References 

Nematocera families
Sciaroidea